Solaris Valletta is a commercial name for the Solaris Urbino 11,001 bus. The bus was produced by the Polish company Solaris Bus & Coach in Bolechowo near Poznań in two versions, as a bus for suburban or interurban public transportation system. A total of four units were built.

History

The first version of the model of the low-entry Solaris Valletta bus was produced in late 2002 and early 2003 for ATP (Assocjazzjoni Transport Pubbliku) in Ħamrun and to be used in the capital city of Malta. The company had only built 3 units. They were adapted for right-hand drive (RHD) in Malta. They use Iveco NEF F4AE0681B engines which qualify for Euro III with a cylinder capacity of 5.9 dm3 and a maximum power of 176 kW (240 hp), as an option was there was the DAF PF 183C engine with a maximum power of 183 kW (250 hp), the transmission was a three-speed Voith Diwa 851.3 automatic gearbox. The engine is mounted at the rear along the axle of the bus, the power is transmitted to the rear axle by ZF A-132. The front suspension uses the ZF RL 85A. The bus is made out of stainless steel.

References

Solaris Bus & Coach
Low-entry buses